Events from the year 1863 in Japan.

Incumbents
Emperor: Kōmei

Events
March 11 - Order to expel barbarians issued by the Emperor.
July 16 - Battle of Shimonoseki Straits
July 20-August 14 - First Shimonoseki Campaign
August 15–17 - Bombardment of Kagoshima
September 29 - Tenchūgumi Incident
December 29 - Second Japanese Embassy to Europe (1863)

Births
February 23 - Katsusaburō Yamagiwa, pathologist
March 14 - Tokutomi Sohō

Deaths
August 27 - Aizawa Seishisai
October 27? - Serizawa Kamo

 
1860s in Japan
Years of the 19th century in Japan